The 2013 Southeastern Conference baseball tournament was held from May 21 through 26 at Hoover Metropolitan Stadium in Hoover, Alabama.  The annual tournament determined the tournament champion of the Division I Southeastern Conference in college baseball.  The tournament champion, LSU, earned the conference's automatic bid to the 2013 NCAA Division I baseball tournament.

The tournament has been held every year since 1977.  Entering the 2013 event, LSU had claimed nine championships, the most of any school.  Original members Georgia and Kentucky along with 1993 addition Arkansas have never won the tournament.  This was the sixteenth consecutive year and eighteenth overall that the event has been held at Hoover Metropolitan Stadium, formerly known as Regions Park.

In 2013, the tournament set a new all-sessions attendance record of 134,496.  The average per session was 8,115.

Seeding and format
The regular season division winners claimed the top two seeds and the next ten teams by conference winning percentage, regardless of division, claimed the remaining berths in the tournament.

The bottom eight teams played a single-elimination opening round, followed by a two-bracket double-elimination format until the semifinals, when the format reverted to single elimination through the championship game.

Bracket

 * - Indicates game required extra innings.

Notes
The Mississippi State vs Missouri first-round game lasted 17 innings. This tied the record for the longest game in SEC Tournament history, which was originally set by Arkansas and Auburn in 1994.

All-Tournament Team
The following players were named to the All-Tournament Team.

Most Valuable Player
Chris Cotton was named Tournament Most Valuable Player.  Cotton was a pitcher for LSU, serving as closer.  In the championship game, he pitched the final 2.2 innings and did not allow any of the eight batters he faced to reach base.

References

Tournament
Southeastern Conference Baseball Tournament
Southeastern Conference baseball tournament
Southeastern Conference baseball tournament
College sports tournaments in Alabama
Baseball competitions in Hoover, Alabama